Botton is a small village within the North York Moors National Park in North Yorkshire, England which is mainly a Camphill Community for people with learning disabilities.

The origins of Botton village 

Botton was founded in 1955 on the initiative of the Camphill community in Scotland and initial direction of Peter Roth. It was the first organisation of its kind within the anthroposophical social therapeutic work specifically for people with disability after they reached adulthood.
It is home to more than 230 people, around 100 of whom are adults with learning disabilities. Many people who live there, live in shared family-style homes together with co-workers, others are supported in shared accommodation with friends or live independently. There are five biodynamic farms located around the village. The community works together on these farms, each person contributing according to his or her ability.

In the village there are many different workshops where villagers make products which are sold to the public via a number of outlets. There are also three shops: a gift shop, for visitors, with items from both Botton and other Camphill villages; a village store, which is the village food shop and a "Coffee Bar" where the villagers and co-workers congregate in the evening to chat and play board games.

Botton village received the Deputy Prime Minister's Award for Sustainable Communities in 2005; the award cited the community's dedication to the ethos of sustainability and mutual respect, as well as their concrete achievements in these areas. Also in 2005, the village featured in a Channel 4 documentary entitled Botton, the strangest village in Britain.

Current disputes 

Some members of the local and surrounding community have been in dispute with the charity that runs the village, the Camphill Village Trust (CVT), taking their case to the High Court. However, following mediation at the beginning of July 2015, both sides are working to find a positive way forward for the community. They will return to review progress with the mediator early in 2016. The dispute centred on whether the historic model of volunteer co-workers receiving financial and other benefits from the charity, instead of a salary, in return for living and working in Botton, was acceptable to Her Majesty's Revenue and Customs (HMRC).

Action for Botton 

Action for Botton – the group campaigning with Botton co-workers for the retention of the voluntary co-worker model – believes that, in introducing paid employment for co-worker's services, the charity is acting against its own founding principles. They highlight many other Camphill Communities that continue to operate the co-worker model. Action for Botton also have letters stating that HMRC do not require volunteer co-workers to be employed Financial Secretary to the Treasury David Gauke writes: "I would like to make it clear that that there has been no recent change in legislation, nor change in rules by HMRC, which affect the tax status of volunteer workers. It appears that changes being introduced by the CVT are as a result of independent advice received by the Trust, and not as a result of any direct or indirect action by HMRC."

However, a letter from HMRC to the CVT, dated 1 December 2014 and published on the Trust's Facebook page indicates otherwise, stating that "HMRC has now provided its Status Opinion in relation to the co-workers within the CVT which is that in our view those co-workers will be employees with effect from 6 April 2015. Consequently our view is that it is now incumbent on the Trustees and Directors of the CVT to take appropriate action mindful of their respectful fiduciary duties."

Action for Botton's main concern was that the move to paid employment would prevent co-workers from continuing to share their homes with learning disabled people in the way they had since Botton was established. During the mediation process, the Trust reaffirmed its commitment to shared living and co-working, within a mixed portfolio of living and care options available to the people it supports.

References

External links 

 Action for Botton
 Botton Buddies
 Botton Village Camphill documentary – Battle for the Soul
 Camphill Village Trust

Villages in North Yorkshire
Anthroposophy